The Samsung Galaxy J5 is an Android smartphone produced by Samsung Electronics. It was unveiled and released in June 2015. It has Qualcomm Snapdragon 410 SoC that is backed by 1.5 GB RAM and that has a 64 bit processor.

It has a 13megapixel rear camera with an LED flash, f/1.9 aperture, auto-focus and a 5megapixel wide-angle front facing camera which can extend up to 120°, also equipped with an LED flash.

Specifications

Hardware
The phone is powered by Qualcomm's Snapdragon 410 chipset that has a 1.2 GHz processor, Adreno 306 GPU and that is backed by 1.5 GB RAM with 8 GB of internal storage and a 2600mAh battery. J500G model comes with a 2100mAh battery. Samsung Galaxy J5 is fitted with a 5-inch HD Super AMOLED display. The South Korean variant adds support for T-DMB & Smart DMB. The phone has a plastic chassis and plastic back cover.

According to the BLE Checker app, the phone supports Bluetooth Low Energy devices.

Software
This phone comes with Android 5.1.1 Lollipop and is upgradable to Android 6.0.1 Marshmallow. It supports 4G LTE with dual SIM enabled 4G and Voice over LTE. It also supports Samsung Knox. In 2016, it received an update to support Samsung S-Bike Mode

For the device, there is an unofficial Android 7.1.1 Nougat firmware based on the official Samsung firmware for SM-A530F.

See also
 Samsung Galaxy J
 Samsung Galaxy
 Samsung
 Android (operating system)
 Samsung Galaxy J series

References

Galaxy Core
Samsung smartphones
Android (operating system) devices
Mobile phones introduced in 2015
Discontinued smartphones
Mobile phones with user-replaceable battery